VRO or vro may refer to:

 Village Reconstruction Organization, social organization active in the reconstruction of villages after natural calamities (India)
 Vera C. Rubin Observatory, formerly known as the Large Synoptic Survey Telescope
 Vermilion River Observatory, a pioneering radio astronomy facility operated by the University of Illinois, source of the VRO catalog of radio objects
 VRO file format, container format used in DVD-VR
 Võro language (ISO 639-3 language code: vro)
 Kawama Airport (IATA airport code: VRO; ICAO airport code: MUKW), Varadero, Matanzas, Cuba
 Aerovitro (ICAO airline code: VRO), see List of airline codes (A)
 Video Replay Operator, a judge in the ISU Judging System
 Vehicle Registration Office, see Vehicle registration plates of the United Kingdom

See also

 Vr0 (rail code), see German railway signalling
 KVRO 101.1 FM; Stillwater, Oklahoma, USA
 WVRO-LP 105.3 FM; Vero Beach, Florida, USA; see List of radio stations in Florida
 
 VR (disambiguation)